Loma Linda University Church of Seventh-day Adventists is a Seventh-day Adventist church on the Loma Linda University campus in Loma Linda, California, United States. By membership, it is the largest Adventist church in the world, with about 6,400 members.

The church hosts two weekly worship services, Sabbath School, and vespers programs on Saturday, which are broadcast live on the Loma Linda Broadcasting Network, as well as weekly programs for the University. There are often mid-week evening Bible study services in the Campus Chapel.

Anthem
Anthem is the contemporary service of the church. The gathering features the same teaching from Senior Pastor Randy Roberts with worship and service programming lead by Josh Jamieson.  The gathering has also released original music under the name Anthem Worship.

References

External links
 Loma Linda University Church of Seventh-day Adventists official website

Church
Seventh-day Adventist churches in the United States
Loma Linda, California
University and college chapels in the United States
Churches in San Bernardino County, California
1928 establishments in California
Churches completed in 1928